Mehboob Ali (1931–2011) was a former leader of Bharatiya Janata Party from Rajasthan. He was a cabinet rank minister from 1977 to 1980 in the Government of Rajasthan headed by Chief minister Shekhewat. He hailed from Bikaner district.

References

Rajasthan MLAs 1977–1980
People from Bikaner district
State cabinet ministers of Rajasthan
1931 births
2011 deaths
Bharatiya Janata Party politicians from Rajasthan